Acmaeidae is a family of sea snails, specifically true limpets, marine gastropod mollusks in the superfamily Lottioidea and the subclass  Patellogastropoda (according to the taxonomy of the Gastropoda by Bouchet & Rocroi, 2005).

Taxonomy
Listed as valid family in Bouchet & Rocroi (2005) but this classification revised following the molecular phylogeny of Nakano & Ozawa (2007). Acmaeinae, including Erginus, was found to be paraphyletic. However, this synonymy was subsequently found incorrect, having been the result of contaminated samples, and Acmaea mitra and a related species, Niveotectura pallida form a well-supported clade outside of the Lottiidae, and Acmaeidae was re-established.

Genera
 Acmaea Eschscholtz, 1833
 † Marbodaeia Chelot, 1886 
 † Pseudorhytidopilus Cox, 1960 
 Rhodopetala Dall, 1921
Synonyms
 † Guerangeria Cossmann, 1885 : synonym of † Marbodaeia Chelot, 1886 (preoccupied by Guerangeria Oehlert, 1881 [Bivalvia]; Marbodaeia Chelot, 1886 is a replacement name)
 † Marbodeia [sic]  : synonym of † Marbodaeia Chelot, 1886  (misspelling in Haber (1932) and others)

References

 Forbes E. (1850). On the genera of British Patellacea. Report of the 19th meeting of the British Association for the Advancement of Science [Birmingham, 1849]. Notices and Abstracts of Communication. 75-76.
 Lindberg D.L. (1981). Rhodopetalinae, a new subfamily of Acmaeidae from the boreal Pacific: anatomy and systematics. Malacologia. 20(2): 291-305.

 
Lottioidea